Welcome Mr. President is a 2013 Italian comedy film directed by Riccardo Milani and starring Claudio Bisio.

Plot 
Giuseppe Garibaldi is a modest librarian in a small town in Piedmont. He loves to read, transmit culture to children, despite the library's lack of funds, and river-fishing. Meanwhile, the elections of the President of the Republic are held in Rome, but political leaders cannot reach an agreement. As a result, main party leaders all choose to vote for a historical figure as a protest vote: unintentionally they all end up electing "Giuseppe Garibaldi". When the vote is confirmed the party leaders are in shock and they immediately want to nullify the vote. The only problem is that there is an eligible citizen with that same exact name, so now by law he has to become the president. The party leaders want him to resign as soon as he takes office but as Giuseppe understands the spreading corruption of Italian politics, he refuses. Once Garibaldi aka “Peppino” becomes the president, he immediately notices the cruel world of Italian politics. Giuseppe, friend of the people, begins to do many good works, earning the popular support. Meanwhile, the leaders of the political parties try to impeach him.

Giuseppe, however, makes a poignant speech to the parliament, putting all the politicians and the Italian public itself to ridicule. A few weeks later, Giuseppe is in his small village when he receives a phone call. Answering it, he finds out that the Vatican has made the same mistake as the parliament and elected him as the new Pope.

Cast 

 Claudio Bisio as Giuseppe 'Peppino' Garibaldi
 Kasia Smutniak as Janis Clementi
 Omero Antonutti as General Secretary Ranieri
 Remo Girone as Morelli
 Giuseppe Fiorello as Center-right leader
 Cesare Bocci as Lega Nord leader
 Massimo Popolizio as Center-left leader
  Franco Ravera as Luciano Cassetti
 Gianni Cavina as Mr. Fausto
  Michele Alhaique as Piero Garibaldi
  Patrizio Rispo as General Cavallo
  Pietro Sarubbi as President of Brazil
 Piera Degli Esposti as Janis' Mother
  Gigio Morra as Spugna 
 Pupi Avati, Lina Wertmüller,  and Gianni Rondolino as the powers-that-be

See also 
 List of Italian films of 2013

References

External links 

2010s political comedy films
Italian political comedy films
Films directed by Riccardo Milani
Films set in Lombardy
Films set in Rome
2010s Italian-language films
2013 films
2010s Italian films